not to be confused with the Madison Correctional Institution, Madison, Florida

The Madison Correctional Institution (MaCI)  is a state prison for men located in London, Madison County, Ohio.  First opened in 1987, the facility has a working population of 2258 inmates, with a mix of security levels (minimum, medium, close, and a few max and super max).

The facility is less than a mile from another Ohio state prison, London Correctional Institution.

References

Prisons in Ohio
Buildings and structures in Madison County, Ohio
1987 establishments in Ohio